First released in 1983 as an extremely limited edition vinyl album, On the Road with Ellison Volume 1 was reissued on CD in 2001 by Deep Shag Records. The CD features liner notes written by Harlan specifically for the release. From the mailing of a dead gopher to a perfect impression of Tattoo from Fantasy Island, you get inside the head of America's most outspoken wordsmith.

Track listing
Intro: Caveat Ellison
You're Short
Selected Quickies
Did You Really Mail A Dead Gopher To An Editor?
Bugfuck Is A Way Of Life
Carl Sagan Is A Nifty Guy
Cosmic Nuhdges
Gee, Gang, Kids Say The Darndest Things
An Edge In My Voice:Installment #54 (December 19, 1982)

References
 Fingerprints on the Sky: The Authorized Harlan Ellison Bibliography, Richmond, T. (2017). Edgeworks Abbey/Subterranean Press.

External links
Deep Shag Records listing for the album
All Music Guide review

1983 live albums
Harlan Ellison albums
1983 debut albums
Deep Shag Records albums